DJ Cheese (born Robert Cheese) is the world title record holder who won the 1986 DMC World Final in London, showcasing the art of scratching in turntablism for the very first time. He also appeared in the 1986 UK tour with Run-DMC. He is known as ‘master of the crossfader’.

Early life
Cheese was born in Oak Hill, West Virginia. From birth, Cheese would live in Edison, New Jersey and later move to Plainfield in 1977.  In 1980 he would become inspired by Grandmaster Flash and begin to develop an interest for hip hop and purchasing and collecting official DJ equipment.

Career
In 1984 DJ Cheese won the DJ Battle for World Supremacy at the New Music Seminar, becoming the first non-NYC DJ to win the title. At the seminar, Cheese would meet and join Tony Prince in competition. Cheese was later Invited by Tony Prince to appear in the inaugural DMC DJ World Championship. Cheeses portion of the competition incorporated scratching, which initiated a different approach to deejay battling and changed the course of DMC competitions moving forward. I

In 1985–1986 under his label Profile Records, Cheese released two vinyl 12" singles with the group Word Of Mouth entitled 'Coast to Coast' and 'King Kut'. King Tut would be used in the coming years as a way of "basing songs around how great your deejay is."

In 1986, Cheese would headline both nights at the London’s "UK Fresh ’86" show at the Wembley Arena.  It was during these performances that DJ Cheese performed his set along with KMC and MC Original G from Word of Mouth. Later that year Cheese would collaborate with Fats Comet on the song 'Eat The Beat'.

References

External links

American hip hop DJs
Living people
Musicians from West Virginia
Musicians from Edison, New Jersey
People from Oak Hill, West Virginia
Musicians from Plainfield, New Jersey
Year of birth missing (living people)